Bristol Airport may refer to:

 Bristol Airport, serving the Bristol area, England (IATA: BRS, ICAO: EGGD)
 Bristol Filton Airport, a former small airport in the Filton area of Bristol, England
 Bristol Aerodrome, in Bristol, New Brunswick, Canada (TC LID: CDA6)